The 1994–95 UC Irvine Anteaters men's basketball team represented the University of California, Irvine during the 1994–95 NCAA Division I men's basketball season. The Anteaters were led by fourth year head coach Rod Baker and played at the Bren Events Center and were members of the Big West Conference.

Previous season 
The 1993–94 UC Irvine Anteaters men's basketball team finished the season with a record of 10–20, 4–14 in Big West play and made a surprise run to the Big West Conference tournament finals.

Roster

Schedule

|-
!colspan=9 style=|Regular Season

|-
!colspan=9 style=| Big West Conference tournament

Source

Awards and honors
Raimonds Miglinieks
Big West First Team All-Conference
Brian Keefe
Big West All-Freshman Team 
Kevin Simmons
Big West All-Freshman Team

Source:

References

UC Irvine Anteaters men's basketball seasons
UC Irvine
UC Irvine Anteaters
UC Irvine Anteaters